Flying  may refer to:
 Flight, the process of flying
 Aviation, the creation and operation of aircraft

Music

Albums
 Flying (Grammatrain album), 1997
 Flying (Jonathan Fagerlund album), 2008
 Flying (UFO album), 1971
 Flying, by Bae Seul-ki
 Flying, by Chas & Dave
 Flying, by The Hometown Band

Songs
 "Flying" (Beatles song), 1967
 "Flying" (Bryan Adams song), 2004
 "Flying" (Cast song), 1996
 "Flying" (Chas & Dave song), 1982
 "Flying", by Anathema from A Natural Disaster
 "Flying", by Badfinger from Straight Up
 "Flying", by Cory Marks from the 2022 extended play I Rise
 "Flying", by James Newton Howard from the film Peter Pan
 "Flying", by Living Colour from Collideøscope
 "Flying", by Stan Rogers from From Fresh Water
 "Flyin'", by Prism from See Forever Eyes

Other uses
 Flying (magazine), a monthly publication
 Flying (film), a 1986 drama film
 "Flying" (The Good Place), an episode of the American comedy television series
 Flying, a 1974 book by Kate Millett

See also
 Fly (disambiguation)
 Flying and gliding animals